Pahari Kinnauri, or Kinnauri Pahari, also known as Oras Boli, is a Western Pahari of northern India. It is spoken by different tribal groups in Kinnaur District; the language used to be commonly known as ‘Kinnauri Tribal language’, but this is now considered a derogatory term. It is not clear how distinct it is from other varieties of Himachali.

Script 
The native script of the language is a variety of Takri script.

Status 
The language is also commonly called Pahari or Himachali. The language has no official status and is recorded under Kinnauri or Pahari. According to the United Nations Education, Scientific and Cultural Organisation (UNESCO), the language is of definitely endangered category, i.e. many Kinnauri Pahari children are not learning Kinnauri Pahari as their mother tongue any longer. One of the reason is he favoritism towards Hindi by the Indian Government.

A demand for the inclusion of 'Pahari (Himachali)' under the Eight Schedule of the Constitution, which is supposed to represent multiple Pahari languages of Himachal Pradesh, was made in the year 2010 by the state's Vidhan Sabha. There has been no positive progress on this matter since then, despite small organisations making efforts to save the language. Due to political interest, the language is currently recorded as a dialect of Hindi, even when having a poor mutual intelligibility with it.
As of now, there is no proposal to grant any status to Kinnauri.

References

 

Northern Indo-Aryan languages
Indo-Aryan languages
Languages of Himachal Pradesh
Endangered languages of India